The 1966–67 Israel State Cup (Gvia HaMedina) was the 28th season of Israel's nationwide football cup competition and the 13th after the Israeli Declaration of Independence.

The competition started on 17 September 1966 with Liga Bet and Liga Gimel clubs. Liga Alef clubs joined the competition in the fourth round, played on 10 December 1966 and Liga Leumit entered in the sixth round, on 18 February 1967.

Later rounds, starting from the seventh round, which was due to be played on 15 April 1967 and up to the final, were delayed due to Israel youth team involvement in the 1967 AFC Youth Championship, and later due to the Six-Day War (including the preceding waiting period), and the competition was completed at the start of the following season.

For the fifth time since the establishment of the competition, and the first time since 1941 (and since the Israeli Declaration of Independence), Maccabi Tel Aviv and Hapoel Tel Aviv met in the final, Maccabi winning 2–1 to collect its 13th cup.

Results

Third round

Fourth round
Liga Alef clubs entered the competition in this round. The IFA arranged the draw so each Liga Alef clubs wouldn't be drawn to play each other.

Fifth round

Sixth Round
Liga Leumit clubs entered the competition in this round. The IFA arranged the draw so each Liga Leumit clubs wouldn't be drawn to play each other.

Seventh Round

Quarter-finals

Semi-finals

Final

Notes

References
100 Years of Football 1906-2006, Elisha Shohat (Israel), 2006

External links
 Israel Football Association website

Israel State Cup
State Cup
State Cup
Israel State Cup seasons